Aimen Bouguerra (born 10 January 1997) is an Algerian professional footballer who plays as a defender for CR Belouizdad and the Algerian national team.

Career 
In 2022, he signed a contract with CR Belouizdad.

Honours
Algeria
FIFA Arab Cup: 2021

References

External links 
 

Living people
1997 births
Algerian footballers
Association football defenders
Paradou AC players
Algerian Ligue Professionnelle 1 players